This list of the reptiles of Greece is primarily based on the Atlas of the Amphibians and Reptiles of Greece (2020), published under the auspices of the Societas Hellenica Herpetologica, supplemented by the IUCN Red List. Of the 66 (IUCN) or 76 (Atlas) species recognized, 11 are endemic, while 4 are assessed as endangered.

In the Atlas, 9 species are currently not recognized on the IUCN Red List ("NR" below), 4 species are recognized on the Red List but with no record of their occurrence in Greece (Italian wall lizard, Podarcis siculus; Andalusian wall lizard, Podarcis vaucheri; blotched snake, Elaphe sauromates; green sea turtle, Chelonia mydas), while 3 species for which there is an IUCN Red List assessment are not included in the Atlas (Rock lizard, Anatololacerta oertzeni ; spotted whip snake, Hemorrhois ravergieri ; meadow viper, Vipera ursinii ).

Order: Squamata (lizards, snakes, and amphisbaenians)

Suborder: Amphisbaenia (amphisbaenians) 
Family: Amphisbaenidae
Genus: Blanus
Turkish worm lizard, Blanus strauchi

Suborder: Lacertilia (lizards) 

Family: Agamidae
Genus: Stellagama
Starred agama, Stellagama stellio 
Family: Anguidae
Genus: Anguis
Peloponnese slow worm, Anguis cephallonica (endemic)
Slow worm, Anguis fragilis 
Greek slow worm, Anguis graeca (NR)
Genus: Pseudopus
European glass lizard, Pseudopus apodus 
Family: Chamaeleonidae
Genus: Chamaeleo
African chameleon, Chamaeleo africanus 
Mediterranean chameleon, Chamaeleo chamaeleon 
Family: Gekkonidae
Genus: Hemidactylus
Turkish gecko, Hemidactylus turcicus 
Genus: Mediodactylus
Barton's thin-toed gecko, Mediodactylus bartoni (NR)(endemic)
Mediterranean thin-toed gecko, Mediodactylus danilewskii (NR)
Kotschy's gecko, Mediodactylus kotschyi 
Oertzen's thin-toed gecko, Mediodactylus oertzeni (NR)
Eastern Mediterranean thin-toed gecko, Mediodactylus orientalis (NR)
Genus: Tarentola
Common wall gecko, Tarentola mauritanica 
Family: Lacertidae
Genus: Algyroides
Greek algyroides, Algyroides moreoticus (endemic)
Dalmatian algyroides, Algyroides nigropunctatus 
Genus: Anatololacerta
Anatolian rock lizard, Anatololacerta anatolica 
Budak's rock lizard, Anatololacerta budaki (NR)
Pelasgian rock lizard, Anatololacerta pelasgiana (NR)
Genus: Darevskia
Meadow lizard, Darevskia praticola 
Genus: Hellenolacerta
Greek rock lizard, Hellenolacerta graeca (endemic)
Genus: Lacerta
Sand lizard, Lacerta agilis 
Balkan green lizard, Lacerta trilineata 
European green lizard, Lacerta viridis 
Genus: Ophisops
Snake-eyed lizard, Ophisops elegans 
Genus: Podarcis
Cretan wall lizard, Podarcis cretensis (endemic)
Erhard's wall lizard, Podarcis erhardii 
Skyros wall lizard, Podarcis gaigeae (endemic)
Ionian wall lizard, Podarcis ionicus (NR)
Pori wall lizard, Podarcis levendis (endemic)
Milos wall lizard, Podarcis milensis (endemic)
Common wall lizard, Podarcis muralis 
Peloponnese wall lizard, Podarcis peloponnesiacus (endemic)
Italian wall lizard, Podarcis siculus 
Balkan wall lizard, Podarcis tauricus 
Andalusian wall lizard, Podarcis vaucheri 
Genus: Zootoca
Viviparous lizard, Zootoca vivipara 
Family: Scincidae
Genus: Ablepharus
Juniper skink, Ablepharus kitaibelii 
Genus: Chalcides
Ocellated skink, Chalcides ocellatus 
Genus: Heremites
Levant skink, Heremites auratus 
Genus: Ophiomorus
Anatolian limbless skink, Ophiomorus kardesi (NR)
Greek snake skink, Ophiomorus punctatissimus (endemic)

Suborder: Serpentes (snakes) 

Family: Colubridae
Genus: Coronella
Smooth snake, Coronella austriaca 
Genus: Dolichophis
Caspian whipsnake, Dolichophis caspius 
Black whipsnake, Dolichophis jugularis 
Genus: Eirenis
Dwarf snake, Eirenis modestus 
Genus: Elaphe
Four-lined snake, Elaphe quatuorlineata 
Blotched snake, Elaphe sauromates 
Genus: Hierophis
Balkan whip snake, Hierophis gemonensis 
Green whip snake, Hierophis viridiflavus 
Genus: Hemorrhois
Coin-marked snake, Hemorrhois nummifer 
Genus: Malpolon
Eastern Montpellier snake, Malpolon insignitus 
Genus: Natrix
Grass snake, Natrix natrix 
Dice snake, Natrix tessellata 
Genus: Platyceps
Slender whipsnake, Platyceps najadum 
Genus: Telescopus
European cat snake, Telescopus fallax 
Genus: Zamenis
Aesculapian ratsnake, Zamenis longissima 
European ratsnake, Zamenis situla 
Family: Boidae
Genus: Eryx
Javelin sand boa, Eryx jaculus 
Family: Typhlopidae
Genus: Xerotyphlops
Eurasian blind snake, Xerotyphlops vermicularis 
Family: Viperidae
Genus: Macrovipera
Cyclades blunt-nosed viper, Macrovipera schweizeri (endemic)
Genus: Montivipera
Rock viper, Montivipera xanthina 
Genus: Vipera
Long-nosed viper, Vipera ammodytes 
Adder, Vipera berus 
Greek meadow viper, Vipera graeca

Order: Testudines (turtles)

Superfamily: Chelonioidea (sea turtles) 
 Family: Cheloniidae
Genus: Caretta
Loggerhead sea turtle, Caretta caretta 
Genus: Chelonia
Green sea turtle, Chelonia mydas 
 Family: Dermochelyidae
Genus: Dermochelys
Leatherback sea turtle, Dermochelys coriacea

Superfamily: Testudinoidea (pond turtles, geoemydid turtles, tortoises) 

 Family: Emydidae
Genus: Emys
European pond turtle, Emys orbicularis 
Genus: Trachemys
Pond slider, Trachemys scripta 
 Family: Geoemydidae
Genus: Mauremys
Balkan pond turtle, Mauremys rivulata 
 Family: Testudinidae
Genus: Testudo
Greek tortoise, Testudo graeca 
Hermann's tortoise, Testudo hermanni 
Marginated tortoise, Testudo marginata

Superfamily: Trionychia (softshell turtles) 
 Family: Trionychidae
Genus: Trionyx
African softshell turtle, Trionyx triunguis

See also

 List of mammals of Greece
 List of birds of Greece
 List of amphibians of Greece
 List of freshwater fishes of Greece

References

External links
 Societas Hellenica Herpetologica

reptiles
Greece
Greece